The family life and children of Vladimir I, popularly known as Vladimir the Great (c.958–1015), grand prince of Kievan Rus', is subject to scholarly studies. The primary sources about his life, such as the Primary Chronicle and the Chronicon Thietmari of Thietmar of Merseburg, are legendary, and require critical scrutiny to separate fact (or history) from fiction (or mythology).

Overview 
Thietmar of Merseburg (c.1015) described Vladimir as a great profligate until his alleged baptism to Christianity around 988. He supposedly had a few hundred concubines in Kiev and in the country residence of Berestovo. He is also said to have had pagan wives, the most well-known being Rogneda of Polotsk. Other wives are mentioned in the Primary Chronicle, with various children assigned to various wives in the different versions of the document. Hence, speculations abound.

According to Tampere University scholar Aleksandr Koptev (2010), 'the legend surrounding Rogneda is closely related to the legend about the Chersonese princess and the prince Jaropolk's widow, all being raped by Prince Vladimir.'

Ancestry and children with Anna

Children with Rogneda and Adela

Children with Olava and Malfrida

Children with German wife and unknown mistress

Norse wife
Norse sagas mention that, while ruling in Novgorod in his early days, Vladimir had a Varangian wife named Olava or Allogia. This unusual name is probably a feminine form of Olaf. According to Snorri Sturluson the runaway Olaf Tryggvason was sheltered by Allogia in her house; she also paid a large fine for him.

Several authorities, notably Rydzevskaya ("Ancient Rus and Scandinavia in 9-14 cent.", 1978), hold that later skalds confused Vladimir's wife Olava with his grandmother and tutor Olga, with Allogia being the distorted form of Olga's name. Others postulate Olava was a real person and the mother of Vysheslav, the first of Vladimir's sons to reign in Novgorod, as behooves the eldest son and heir. On the other hand, there is no evidence that the tradition of sending the eldest son of Kievan monarch to Novgorod existed at such an early date.

Those scholars who believe that this early Norse wife was not fictitious, suppose that Vladimir could have married her during his famous exile in Scandinavia in the late 970s. They usually refer an account in Ingvars saga (in a part called Eymund's saga) which tells that Eric VI of Sweden married his daughter to a 'konung of fjord lying to the East from Holmgard'. This prince may have been Vladimir the Great.

Polotsk wife

Rogneda of Polotsk is the best known of Vladimir's Varangian pagan wives.

According to the Primary Chroncile, Vladimir wanted to forge an alliance with her father, prince Rogvolod of Polotsk, but after she refused to marry Vladimir, he raped and forcibly married Rogneda. Koptev (2010) hypothesised that the story of Rogneda's revenge (found in the Laurentian Chronicle under the year 1128), namely her attempt to kill her husband Vladimir, was 'an obvious later addition to the original story of Rogneda, known in the Primary Chronicle under the year 980.' Koptev stated that "Shakhmatov is almost certainly correct when he suggests that the story derives from the later Novgorodian tradition, which asserted the superiority of the clan of Jaroslav's descendants in comparison to Rogvolod's descendants ruling in Polotzk.'

The Primary Chronicle mentions three of Rogneda's sons - Izyaslav of Polotsk (+1001), Vsevolod of Volhynia (+ca 995), and Yaroslav the Wise. Following an old Yngling tradition, Izyaslav inherited the lands of his maternal grandfather, i.e., Polotsk. According to the Kievan succession law, his progeny forfeited their rights to the Kievan throne, because their forefather had never ruled in Kiev supreme. They, however, retained the principality of Polotsk and formed a dynasty of local rulers, of which Vseslav the Sorcerer was the most notable.

Greek wife
During his unruly youth, Vladimir begot his eldest son, Sviatopolk, relations with whom would cloud his declining years. His mother was a Greek nun captured by Svyatoslav I in Bulgaria and married to his lawful heir Yaropolk I. Russian historian Vasily Tatischev, invariably erring in the matters of onomastics, gives her the fanciful Roman name of Julia. When Yaropolk was murdered by Vladimir's agents, the new sovereign raped his wife and she soon gave birth to a child. Thus, Sviatopolk was probably the eldest of Vladimir's sons, although the issue of his parentage has been questioned and he has been known in the family as "the son of two fathers".

Bohemian wife

Vladimir apparently had a Czech wife, whose name is given by Vasily Tatishchev as Malfrida. Historians have gone to extremes in order to provide a political rationale behind such an alliance, as the Czech princes are assumed to have backed up Vladimir's brother Yaropolk rather than Vladimir. His children by these marriage were probably Svyatoslav of Smolensk, killed during the 1015 internecine war, and Mstislav of Chernigov. Some chronicles, however, report that Rogneda was Mstislav's mother.

Bulgarian wife
Another wife was a Bulgarian lady, whose name is given by Tatishchev as Adela. Historians have disagreed as to whether she came from Volga Bulgaria or from Bulgaria on the Danube. According to the Primary Chronicle, both Boris and Gleb were her children. This tradition, however, is viewed by most scholars as a product of later hagiographical tendency to merge the identity of both saints. Their names point to different origins, indicating that Adela was not fully Bulgarian.

Anna Porphyrogenita

Anna (March 13, 963 - 1011/12) was the daughter of Byzantine Emperor Romanos II and the Empress Theophano. She was also the sister of Emperors Basil II Bulgaroktonos (the Bulgar-Slayer) and Constantine VIII. Anna was a Porphyrogenita, a legitimate daughter born in the special purple chamber of the Byzantine Emperor's Palace. Anna's hand was considered by Vladimir such a prize that he allegedly became Christian (988) just to marry her.

German wife

Thietmar of Merseburg, writing from contemporary accounts, mentions that Bolesław I of Poland captured Vladimir's widow during his raid on Kiev in 1018 but Anna is known to have predeceased Vladimir by four years. So historians long had no clue who this wife was. The emigré historian Nicholas Baumgarten, however, pointed out that in the controversial records called the Genealogia Welforum and the Historia Welforum Weingartensis one daughter of Count Kuno von Oenningen (future Duke Konrad of Swabia) by "filia Ottonis Magni imperatoris" (Otto the Great's daughter; possibly Rechlinda Otona [Regelindis], claimed by some as a legitimate daughter born from his first marriage with Edith of Wessex and by others as an illegitimate child) married "rex Rugorum" (king of Russia). He interpreted this evidence as pertaining to Vladimir's last wife.

It is believed that the only child of this alliance was Dobronega, or Maria, who married Casimir I of Poland between 1038 and 1042. As her father Vladimir died about 25 years before that marriage and she was still young enough to bear at least five children, including two future Polish dukes (Bolesław II of Poland, who later became a king, and Wladyslaw Herman), it is thought probable that she was Vladimir's daughter by the last marriage.

Yaroslav's parentage
There is also a case for Yaroslav's descent from Anna. According to this theory, Nestor the Chronicler deliberately represented Yaroslav as Rogneda's son, because he systematically removed all information concerning Kievan ties with Byzantium, spawning pro-Varangian bias (see Normanist theory for details). Proponents allege that Yaroslav's true age was falsified by Nestor, who attempted to represent him as 10 years older than he actually had been, in order to justify Yaroslav's seizure of the throne at the expense of his older brothers.

The Primary Chronicle, for instance, states that Yaroslav died at the age of 76 in 1054 (thus putting his birth at 978), while dating Vladimir's encounter and marriage to Yaroslav's purported mother, Rogneda, to 980.  Elsewhere, speaking about Yaroslav's rule in Novgorod (1016), Nestor says that Yaroslav was 28, thus putting his birth at 988.  The forensic analysis of Yaroslav's skeleton seems to have confirmed these suspicions, estimating Yaroslav's birth at ca. 988-990, after both the Baptism of Kievan Rus and Vladimir's divorce of Rogneda. Consequently, it is assumed that Yaroslav was either Vladimir's natural son born after the latter's baptism or his son by Anna.

Had Yaroslav an imperial Byzantine descent, he likely would not have stinted to advertise it. Some have seen the willingness of European kings to marry Yaroslav's daughters as an indication of this imperial descent.  Subsequent Polish chroniclers and historians, in particular, were eager to view Yaroslav as Anna's son.  Recent proponents invoke onomastic arguments, which have often proven decisive in the matters of medieval prosopography, but these may be worthless in this case specifically because of the great shift to Christian names just then experienced in the Rus royal dynasty, an upheaval more than enough to explain all unprecedented names if they are Christian. It is curious that Yaroslav named his elder son Vladimir (after his own father) and one of his daughters Anna (as if after his own mother).  Also, there is a certain pattern in his sons having Slavic names (as Vladimir), and his daughters having Greek names only (as Anna).  However, in the absence of better sources, Anna's maternity remains a pure speculation.

Obscure offspring
Vladimir had several children whose maternity cannot be established with certainty. These include two sons, Stanislav of Smolensk and Sudislav of Pskov, the latter outliving all of his siblings. There is also one daughter, named Predslava, who was captured by Bolesław I in Kiev and taken with him to Poland as a concubine. Another daughter, Premyslava, is attested in numerous (though rather late) Hungarian sources as the wife of Duke Ladislaus, one of the early Arpadians.

Footnotes 

Vladimir I
 
Vladimir 1
Mythological rape victims